Siocon, officially the Municipality of Siocon (Subanen: Benwa Siocan; Chavacano: Municipalidad de Siocan), is a 1st class municipality in the province of Zamboanga del Norte, Philippines. According to the 2020 census, it has a population of 48,524 people.

Visitors describe Siocon as a "hidden paradise".

Local industry includes the Canatuan mine.

History
In 1955, the following barrios were created:
 Lituban - from the sitios of Lituban, Pangian, Quibanbanan and Tabayo;
 Tibangao - from the sitios of Tibangao, Daanlawas, Mangcabing, Cuab and Matiag;
 Balagunan - from the sitios of Baliguian, Mamad and Balagunan Grande; and
 Malipot - from the sitios of Malipot, Siay, Kanibungan, Baligngan and Pisawac.

In May 2003, the municipality was attacked by 150 Moro Islamic Liberation Front (MILF) and Abu Sayyaf guerrillas. The attack commenced at 12 a.m. on May 4. A small group of policemen led by 27-year-old police senior inspector Ranie Planilla Hachuela defended Siocon during the assault, which lasted nine hours. Hachuela managed to rally his men in putting up stiff resistance against the wave of attacks by the rebels trying to overrun the municipal hall, police station, and hospital. For this reason he was awarded the Medal of Valor for risking his life and for rescuing the town mayor and his family.

The rebels created an intricate plan of securing the entry and exit points of the Poblacion (town center). Responding government troops were ambushed as they tried to aid the outnumbered policemen.

That frightening feeling was expressed by Wiljun "Pido" Cubero as he narrated how the rebels stormed the municipal hall and fire station right next to their house at Micubo's compound.

Thirteen of the 150 rebels were killed, including Jairullah Hassan (aka Commander Hairon of the MILF) who headed the attack.

Eleven government troops and 25 civilians also lost their lives in the assault, including two seminarians. The public market was burned down, while civilians were taken out of their homes to be used as human shields as rebels withdrew. Some hostages were released hours later, while other strong men were held for days as they were tasked to carry wounded rebels through the thick forest in the municipality of Sibuco.

The day after the attack, MILF spokesman Eid Kabalu expressed that it was a show of force by the MILF and Abu Sayyaf within the area.

Geography

Barangays
Siocon is politically subdivided into 26 barangays.

Climate

Demographics

Economy

Education

Most of its 26 barangays have their respective public elementary schools and only few have public secondary schools. In the town proper has its elementary and secondary public schools and a state university.

Elementary

Secondary
Siocon NHS (to be converted into "Siocon Science High School")
Santa Maria National High School-Annex
Canatuan National High School-Annex
Siay Integrated School
Makiang National High School
Julian Soriano Memorial Comprehensive High School (formerly known as Siocon National Vocational School)

Tertiary
Jose Rizal Memorial State University – Siocon

Notable personalities

Jonathan "Lightning" Taconing (b. 1987) - Filipino boxer

References

External links
 Siocon Profile at PhilAtlas.com
 Official Website
 [ Philippine Standard Geographic Code]
Philippine Census Information

Municipalities of Zamboanga del Norte
Mining communities in the Philippines